Paris Male Academy, also known as the Nimrod Ashcraft House, is a historic school building located at Paris, Monroe County, Missouri.

History
The Paris Male Academy is a Greek Revival style, two-story, three bay, side passage plan, brick building with a rear addition, built in 1854. It has a front gable roof and four brick pilasters on the front facade.  The building housed the Paris Male Academy until 1869, after which it became a private residence.

The Academy is significant under criterion A, in the area of Education, as it delivered a high level of education to students from the local area; and under criterion C, in the area of Architecture, as a rare surviving example of a building employed for private education in Missouri.

It was listed on the National Register of Historic Places on January 24, 1990.

References

External links
A Romance Of The Old Seminary
 

School buildings on the National Register of Historic Places in Missouri
Greek Revival architecture in Missouri
School buildings completed in 1854
Schools in Monroe County, Missouri
National Register of Historic Places in Monroe County, Missouri